Cornelia Ullrich, née Feuerbach (born 26 April 1963 in Halberstadt) is a retired East German hurdler. She represented the sports team SC Magdeburg.

Biography
She won the bronze medals at the 1986 European Championships and the 1987 World Championships.

Her personal best time was 53.58 seconds, achieved in August 1987 in Potsdam. This result which ranks her second among German 400 m hurdlers, only behind Sabine Busch

References

1963 births
Living people
People from Halberstadt
People from Bezirk Magdeburg
East German female hurdlers
Sportspeople from Saxony-Anhalt
World Athletics Championships medalists
European Athletics Championships medalists
World Athletics Championships winners